Pueraria tuberosa, commonly known as kudzu, Indian kudzu, or Nepalese kudzu, Vidarikand, Sanskrit: Bhukushmandi (भूकुशमंडी) is a climber with woody tuberculated stem. It is a climbing, coiling and trailing vine with large tuberous roots. Leaves are trifoliate and alternate, while the leaflets are egg-shaped, with round base and unequal sides. They have silky, bristly reddish-brown hair. Seeds vary from 3 to 6 in number.

It is native to India, Pakistan, and Nepal.  In Telugu, Kudzu is termed as Nela Gummadi, Dari Gummadi, Vidari Kanda.

Conservation status
Kudzu is facing extinction in the wild because of herb hunters who trade the tubers illegally to agents of pharmaceutical or Ayurvedic companies. In the black market, the red variety kudzu tuber of about 10 kg is believed to be very expensive ranging up to lakhs of rupees. The tubers are not disturbed from the plant, but the agents draw the juice of the tuber using syringes.

References

tuberosa
Plants described in 1825